South Darfur State ( Wilāyat Ǧanūb Dārfūr; Janob Darfor) is one of the wilayat or states of Sudan. It is one of the five states that compose the region of Darfur in western Sudan.

Overview

Nyala is the capital of the state. The State was affected by the 2010 Sahel famine.

References

External links
Government of South Darfur
State profile

 
States of Sudan
Darfur